Fred Simonsson (born 27 November 1994) is a Swedish former tennis player.

Simonsson has a career high ATP singles ranking of 633, achieved on 1 August 2016. His career high ATP doubles ranking of 195 was achieved on 20 February 2017.

Tennis career
Simonsson made his ATP main draw doubles debut at the 2012 Swedish Open. He reached the quarterfinals of the 2015 Swedish Open partnering Jonathan Mridha and repeated the achievement at the 2016 Swedish Open  partnering Isak Arvidsson.

In March 2016 Simonsson won the ATP Challenger Tour doubles tournament RC Hotel Open partnering Isak Arvidsson. With the same partner he won the 2016 Båstad Challenger in July. After Fred Simonsson's retirement in 2019, he started his own tennis blog called tennispredict.com.

ATP Challengers and ITF Futures titles

Singles: 1

Doubles: 16 
{|
|- valign=top
|

See also
List of Sweden Davis Cup team representatives

References

External links

1994 births
Living people
Swedish male tennis players
People from Lidingö Municipality
Sportspeople from Stockholm County
21st-century Swedish people